Glischropus is a genus of bats within the vesper bat family, Vespertilionidae. Species within this genus are:
 Glischropus aquilus (Görföl, Wiantoro, Kingston, Bates & Huang, 2015) — dark thick-thumbed bat
 Glischropus bucephalus.
 Glischropus javanus Chasen, 1939 — Javan thick-thumbed bat
 Glischropus tylopus (Dobson, 1875) — common thick-thumbed bat
 G. t. tylopus
 G. t. batjanus

References

 
Bat genera
Taxa named by George Edward Dobson